The American School of Recife (or EAR) is an American school in the city of Recife, Brazil.

The school, founded in 1957, is a private, non-profit, coeducational day school which offers an instructional program from early childhood through grade 12 for students of all nationalities. The School does not have any religious affiliation. The school year comprises 2 semesters extending from early August to mid-December and from early February to mid-June.

Organization 
The American School of Recife is a private, non-profit, co-educational day school founded in 1957. The school offers a Nursery through Grade 12 instructional program for students currently representing 13 nationalities. The two semesters comprising the school year extend from August to December and from January to June. The school is accredited by AdvancED-SACS in the United States and by the State of Pernambuco Ministry of Education and Recife Municipal Education Council in Brazil. The school is a member of the Association of American Schools in Brazil (AASB), the Association of American Schools in South America (AASSA), and the Association for the Advancement of International Education (AAIE). Class hours are 7:50 a.m.-3:15 p.m., and extra-curricular activities start at 3:30 p.m. The school has no religious affiliation.

The School is governed by a seven-member Board of Directors elected for a two-year term by the General Assembly composed of the parents of children enrolled in the school. The School is not incorporated in the United States. It is officially registered in the State of Pernambuco as a Civil Society with tax-exempt status under Brazilian law.

Curriculum 
The school provides a U.S. standards-based, college preparatory curriculum that enables students to successfully enter universities in the U.S., Brazil, and throughout the world.
 
Instruction is in English, with Portuguese language study beginning in Pre-Kindergarten.
Support is provided for language learning difficulties and mild learning disabilities.
Electives include Spanish, French, computer science, art, music, photography, Virtual High School online courses, and a wide variety of Advanced Placement courses. Extra-curricular activities may include soccer, volleyball, basketball, indoor soccer, tennis, dance, drama, math club, chess club, Eco Club, robotics, Knowledge Bowl, National Honor Society, and Model United Nations.

The school is accredited by Cognia in the United States and by the State of Pernambuco Ministry of Education and Recife Municipal Education Council in Brazil.
The school is a member of the Association of American Schools in Brazil (AASB), the Association of American Schools in South America (AASSA) and the Association for the Advancement of International Education (AAIE).

Facilities 
The School occupies 8.5 acres (34,000 m2) in a preferred residential area of Recife. The pre-school, elementary school, and secondary school divisions are in separate buildings. Facilities include 48 classrooms, science lab, biology lag, music room, small theater, technology lab, two libraries, two dining areas, two faculty resource centers, infirmary, administrative offices, four playgrounds, three multi-sport covered courts, a tennis court, a soccer field and two beach volleyball courts.

See also

American Brazilians

References

External links
Website (in English and Portuguese)
U.S. State Department page

Educational institutions established in 1957
American international schools in Brazil
Schools in Recife
1957 establishments in Brazil
Association of American Schools in South America